Maginsk is a rural locality (a selo) and the administrative centre of Maginsky Selsoviet, Karaidelsky District, Bashkortostan, Russia. The population was 1,491 as of 2010. There are 24 streets.

Geography 
Maginsk is located 17 km southeast of Karaidel (the district's administrative centre) by road. Berdyash is the nearest rural locality.

References 

Rural localities in Karaidelsky District